The Best of Chris Cagle is the first greatest hits album by country music artist Chris Cagle. It was released on February 9, 2010 via Capitol Records Nashville. The album features Cagle's 5 top ten U.S. Billboard Hot Country Songs.

Critical reception
Stephen Thomas Erlewine of Allmusic rated the compilation four stars out of five, commending the album's non-chronological pacing by saying that it "open[s] and clos[es] with bursts of energy and spend[s] a lot of time riding a midtempo in the middle." He also thought that the compilation showed Cagle's artistic consistency.

Track listing

Chart performance

References

2010 greatest hits albums
Chris Cagle albums
Capitol Records compilation albums